Lieutenant Frank Tremar Sibly Menendez (26 January 1896 – 27 February 1973) was a British World War I flying ace credited with six aerial victories.

Family background and education
Menendez was the only son of The Honourable F. M. Menendez, of Nassau, the Bahamas and his wife Maud, the sister of G. W. Sibly, founder of Wycliffe College, Gloucestershire. Menendez attended his uncle's school from 1909 to 1912, before going up to St John's College, Cambridge, to study law.

Military service

In 1914 Menendez abandoned his studies to enlist in the Army. He was commissioned as temporary second lieutenant on 19 March 1915, serving in the York and Lancaster Regiment, until transferring to the Gloucestershire Regiment on 10 September 1915.

He was sent to France on 1 January 1916, and was promoted to lieutenant on 20 April. He was appointed an acting-captain while serving as a company commander from 29 July to 17 December 1916, during the Battle of the Somme. He also distinguished himself by leading trench raids at Neuve-Chapelle.

On 11 August 1917 he was appointed a flying officer (observer), and transferred to General List of the Royal Flying Corps, with seniority from 28 May. He was posted to No. 57 Squadron, flying the Airco D.H.4 two-seater day bomber. Paired with Australian pilot Second Lieutenant Arthur Thomas Drinkwater, Menendez gained his first aerial victory on 18 August by driving down an Albatros D.V out of control over Courtrai, repeating the feat two days later over Houthulst Forest. On 21 September he accounted for two more D.Vs, one destroyed and the other driven down, over Dadizeele. He gained another double victory on 12 November, driving down two D.Vs south-east of Houthulst.

On 27 October 1917 Menendez was awarded the Military Cross, which was gazetted on 15 March 1918. His citation read:
Temporary Lieutenant Frank Tremar Silby Menendez, General List and Royal Flying Corps.
"For conspicuous gallantry and devotion to duty in carrying out photographic reconnaissances and bombing raids far behind the enemy lines. On one occasion, when attacked by five enemy scouts, he drove three of them down and the other two then withdrew. On two other occasions he has driven down enemy machines out of control."

Menendez returned to England for flight training, being regraded from observer to pilot on 30 May 1918. However, on 1 August, he was involved in a mid-air collision over Ipswich. He survived, but was seriously injured, losing one eye and requiring facial reconstruction. On 5 June 1919 he relinquished his RAF commission on account of his injuries, but was permitted to retain his rank.

Post-war career
After spending some time recuperating in the Bahamas, Menendez married, and had two children. In August 1927 he joined the Civil Service, serving in the Department of Overseas Trade. During World War II he served as a Lewis gunner in the Home Guard, and was also seconded to the Ministry of Economic Warfare.

Menendez died in a nursing home in Eastbourne, Sussex, on 27 February 1973.

References

Bibliography
 Franks, Norman; Guest, Russell; Alegi, Gregory (2008). Above The War Fronts: A Complete Record of the British Two-seater Bomber Pilot and Observer Aces, the British Two-seater Fighter Observer Aces, and the Belgian, Italian, Austro-Hungarian and Russian Fighter Aces, 1914–1918. Grub Street Publishing. , 

1896 births
1973 deaths
People from Nassau, Bahamas
People educated at Wycliffe College, Gloucestershire
Alumni of St John's College, Cambridge
York and Lancaster Regiment officers
Gloucestershire Regiment officers
Royal Flying Corps officers
Royal Air Force personnel of World War I
Recipients of the Military Cross
British World War I flying aces
Civil servants in the Board of Trade
Civil servants in the Ministry of Economic Warfare
British Home Guard soldiers